Buccaneer is a 1997 action/strategy video game from Strategic Simulations. The player commands a pirate ship in the Caribbean during the 17th century.

Reception

GameSpot gave the game a score of 4.5 out of 10 stating"If you long for a quality fighting sail game, you'll be better off loading up TalonSoft's Age of Sail, the lone bright light in a sea of mediocrity"

Dirk Lammers from the The Tampa Tribune praised the 3-D graphics and battle sequences but criticized the missions plots which he thought were too shallow.

References

1997 video games
Action video games
Multiplayer and single-player video games
Strategic Simulations games
Strategy video games
Video games about pirates
Video games set in the 17th century
Video games set in the Caribbean
Windows games